Richard Bertinet is a renowned Breton baker who now bakes and teaches in Bath, Somerset.  He has  campaigned for "real bread" and he was acclaimed as a food champion by the BBC in 2010.

References

External links
 The Bertinet Kitchen – official website

Bakers